Alizée Costes (born 9 August 1994) is a French female acrobatic gymnast. With partners Madeleine Bayon and Noémie Nadaud, Costes achieved 7th in the 2014 Acrobatic Gymnastics World Championships.

References

1994 births
Living people
French acrobatic gymnasts
Female acrobatic gymnasts
Place of birth missing (living people)
Sportspeople from Rennes
21st-century French women